Grandeur may refer to:

 70 mm Grandeur film
 Hyundai Grandeur, a car introduced in 1986
 Grandeur of the Seas, a cruise ship placed in service in 1996
 Grandeur Terrace, a public housing estate in Tin Shui Wai, Hong Kong
 "Oh! The Grandeur", a 1999 indie rock album by Andrew Bird's Bowl of Fire

See also 
 Delusions of grandeur (disambiguation)
 Grand (disambiguation)